The Copa América is an international association football competition established in 1916. It is contested by the men's national teams of the members of the Confederación Sudamericana de Fútbol (CONMEBOL), the sport's continental governing body. The most recent Copa América, was hosted by Brazil in 2021. Argentina became champions, having beaten Brazil 1–0 in the final, and Colombia took third place after beating Peru 3–2.

The Copa América final matches are the last of the competition, and the results determine which country's team is declared South American champions. If after 90 minutes of regular play the score is a draw, a penalty shootout takes place. The winning penalty shoot-out team are then declared champions. Every edition from 1916 to 1967 involved a final round-robin group. Nevertheless, when the two best placed teams finished equaled on points, a final match had to be held to define a winner. Those circumstantial finals were played in the 1919, 1922, 1937, 1949, and 1953 editions.

In 1975 the competition format switched to a knockout stage with a final held every edition. Ever since the competition was rebranded to its present state, the tournament has been decided by a one-off match on every occasion except 1989 and 1991, when the winner was decided by a final group contested by four teams.

With 15 titles, Argentina and Uruguay are the most successful Copa América teams. Brazil has nine. The other former champions are Paraguay, Peru and Chile, with two titles each, and Bolivia, and Colombia, who have each won one.

Finals

Results by nation

* Indicates host country

References

External links
 The Copa América Archive by Martín Tabeira on the RSSSF

Finals
 
Copa America